Roche-Saint-Secret-Béconne (Occitan: La Ròcha Sant Segret e Becona) is a commune in the Drôme department in the Auvergne-Rhône-Alpes region in Southeastern France. In 2019, it had a population of 464.

Demographics

See also
Communes of the Drôme department

References

Communes of Drôme